Aqualad is the name of two fictional comic book superheroes appearing in media published by DC Entertainment. The first Aqualad, Garth, debuted in February 1960 in Adventure Comics #269 and was created by writer Robert Bernstein and artist Ramona Fradon. This Aqualad also appeared in animated form on television in 1967 and 1968.

The second Aqualad, "Kaldur" Kaldur'ahm, originally debuted in 2010, created for the Young Justice animated television series by Brandon Vietti, Greg Weisman and Phil Bourassa. Several months prior to the launch of the cartoon, an altered version of the character introduced as Jackson Hyde was brought into comic books by writer Geoff Johns and artist Ivan Reis.

The Garth version of Aqualad made his live-action debut in the television series Titans, played by Drew Van Acker.

Fictional character biography

Garth

Years ago, King Thar and his wife Queen Berra became the reigning monarchs of Shayeris, the capital of a group of Idyllist colonies in the Hidden Valley. Radical Idyllists deposed and murdered King Thar and banished his pregnant wife Queen Berra to Poseidonis, the capital city of Atlantis; there she gave birth to Garth, a child with purple eyes. Superstitious Atlanteans claimed that Garth had been born genetically inferior due to his purple eyes and banished him to a barren seabed leagues away from Atlantis. He survived and later befriended Aquaman, the sometimes outcast King of Atlantis. He was a founding member of the Teen Titans, and later became known as Tempest.

Kaldur'ahm (Jackson Hyde)

Jackson Hyde first appeared in Brightest Day #10 (September 2010). This coincides with the appearance of Aqualad in the Young Justice animated series (albeit using the name Kaldur'ahm). According to Johns, the new Aqualad is named Jackson Hyde, and is a black teenager from New Mexico. In a teaser poster for the Brightest Day event, he is shown using "hard water" abilities to create a sword. This ability had previously been thought to belong exclusively to Aquaman's wife, Mera, and people from her world.

In other media

Television
 Aqualad's first animated appearance was alongside Aquaman in The Superman/Aquaman Hour of Adventure, as well as in the Teen Titans shorts that were part of the series. The Aquaman cartoon series of 1968 was a repackaged 30-minute version featuring primarily (but not exclusively) Aquaman and Aqualad. He was voiced by Jerry Dexter.
 Aqualad has also appeared in Teen Titans, voiced by Wil Wheaton. His first appearance was in "Deep Six" where he and the Titans defeated Trident; here and in his other appearances, he demonstrates telepathic control of sea life. In "Winner Take All", Aqualad demonstrates the ability to control water by means of Hydrokinesis. In the series, he serves as a Titans East member, a short term crush on Raven and Starfire, and a temporary rival to Beast Boy. He is now an official member of Teen Titans' sister group, Titans East, with Bumblebee, Speedy, and the twins Más y Menos. 
 Aqualad also makes eight appearances on the comic series based on the show. In his first appearance in Teen Titans Go! (issue #10), he searches for Gill Girl. He told the Titans that she used to have a crush on him, but he looked at her like a sister. Beast Boy did not believe him and says that she dumped him. He made short appearances in #20, #25, & #27. One of the stories in issue #30 focused on him and Speedy. In issue #48 an alternative version of him as Tempest appeared in a group called the Teen Tyrants.
 Aqualad appears in Batman: The Brave and the Bold, voiced by Zack Shada as a teenager and by Zachary Gordon as a child. Here, Aqualad is shown to be in his late teens and is very resentful of the praise lavished upon Aquaman, eventually telling him off in the episode's final scene.
 Garth appears in the Young Justice episode "Downtime", voiced by Yuri Lowenthal. In the episode, it is explained that Garth is the best friend of Kaldur’ahm. While Kaldur went on to become Aquaman's sidekick, Garth stayed in Atlantis to hone his abilities at an Atlantean sorcery conservatory. Sometime in between this, and the episode "Downtime", he started a relationship with Tula (Aquagirl), who was formerly involved with Kaldur. A reference to his Tempest identity is made during a battle with Black Manta, with Garth shouting "I summon the power of the tempest!" while conjuring a cyclone. As of Season 3, Garth has taken the role as Ambassador for Atlantis in the UN.
 Aqualad appears in Young Justice, voiced by Khary Payton. His name is Kaldur'ahm, but he goes by the nickname Kaldur. Within the series, he is the son of supervillain Black Manta, and the leader of Young Justice. In the episode "Alienated", Kaldur leaves the team to join his father. He blames the team for Aquagirl's death on a mission and Aquaman for not telling him who his real father was. He dons a similar outfit to Black Manta. While confronting the team, he appears to murder Artemis. However, this is an elaborate ruse to go undercover in Black Manta's organization, gaining information on the Reach and the Light. Between Seasons 2 and 3, Kaldur takes up the role of Aquaman, as Orin chooses to become King of Atlantis full-time. In Season 4, after completing a mission to find the crown of Atlantis' former King Arion, Orin decides to split the role of Aquaman alongside himself, Kaldur, and La'gaan, and Kaldur decides to take a leave of absence.
 The Kaldur’ahm version of Aqualad appears in Teen Titans Go!, again voiced by Khary Payton. The Garth version of Aqualad also appears, once again voiced by Wil Wheaton, and resembling his design from season one of Young Justice.
 The Garth version of Aqualad appears in season 2 of the DC Universe series Titans, portrayed by Drew Van Acker.
 The Garth version of Aqualad appears in DC Super Hero Girls, voiced by Jessica McKenna. This incarnation is much younger than other versions, still being a child-like teenager, and is a student at Metropolis High School. His last name is also mentioned as being Bernstein, and he is shown to be carrying small bottles of water around for when he needs to use his superpowers.
 An Aqualad live-action series for HBO Max starring Jake Hyde, a gay teenager, is in development. Charlize Theron, A.J. Dix, Beth Kono and Andrew Haas of Denver & Delilah Films are executive producers for the series.

Film
 Aqualad appears in a cameo in the movie after the series, Teen Titans: Trouble in Tokyo. As the Titans travel to Tokyo, Japan he comes out of the water and waves to them.
 Both Garth and Kaldur'ahm appear in 2013's direct-to-DVD Justice League: The Flashpoint Paradox as members of Aquaman's army in the altered timeline.
 Garth makes a brief appearance in Teen Titans Go! To the Movies.

Video games
 The Garth version of Aqualad appears in the video game Aquaman: Battle for Atlantis. He is also an unlockable character in the game.
 In the video game Young Justice: Legacy, both Aqualad and Tempest appear with Khary Payton and Yuri Lowenthal reprising their roles.
 The Kaldur’ahm version of Aqualad appears as a playable character in Lego DC Super-Villains.

References

External links
Titans Tower: Aqualad
Comicvine: Aqualad

DC Comics sidekicks
Comics characters introduced in 1960
DC Comics Atlanteans
DC Comics characters who can move at superhuman speeds
DC Comics characters with superhuman strength
Fictional characters with water abilities
Characters created by Robert Bernstein
Teenage characters in comics